Dinapigue Agta is a Northeastern Luzon language. It is one of the Aeta languages.

References

Lobel, Jason William. 2013. Philippine and North Bornean languages: issues in description, subgrouping, and reconstruction. Ph.D. dissertation. Manoa: University of Hawai'i at Manoa.
Robinson, Laura C. and Jason William Lobel (2013). "The Northeastern Luzon Subgroup of Philippine Languages." Oceanic Linguistics 52.1 (2013): 125-168.

Aeta languages
Northeastern Luzon languages
Languages of Isabela (province)